Nesticella aelleni, is a species of spider of the genus Nesticella. It is endemic to Sri Lanka.

See also
 List of Nesticidae species

References

Nesticidae
Endemic fauna of Sri Lanka
Spiders of Asia
Spiders described in 1972